Historia Musical Romántica (Eng.: Romantic Music History') is the title of a compilation album released by romantic music group Grupo Bryndis. This album became their first number-one hit on the Billboard Top Latin Albums chart.

Track listing
This information from Billboard.com
Te Vas Con El (Mauro Posadas) — 2:19
Te Esperaré (Mauro Posadas) — 2:24
La Luz de Mi Vida (Juan Guevara Ceballos) — 0:59
Entre Tu y Yo (Mauro Posadas) — 2:21
Amor Prohíbido (Mauro Posadas) — 3:19
Regresa (Guadalupe Guevara) — 1:10
Otro Ocupa Mi Lugar (Miguel Gallardo) — 1:28
Que Mas Te Da (Camilo Blanes) — 1:33
Y Todo Acabó (Guadalupe Guevara/Juan Guevara/Mauro Posadas) — 1:13
Te Juro Que Te Amo (Lauzi/Mogol/Prudente) — 3:02
Tu Traición (Mauro Posadas) — 1:38
Sólo Te Amo a Ti (Mauro Posadas) — 1:54
Mi Verdadero Amor (Claudio Pablo Montaño) — 1:49
Por Estar Pensando en Ti (Mauro Posadas) — 2:05
Olvidemos Nuestro Orgullo (Mauro Posadas) — 3:01
Así Es el Amor (Gerardo Izaguirre) — 2:14
Volvamos a Empezar (Mauro Posadas) — 1:51
Cuando Vuelvas Tú (Guadalupe Guevara) — 3:49
Regresa a Mí (Mauro Posadas) — 2:15
Por Qué Me Enamoré (Guadalupe Guevara) — 1:36
Pagando Mi Pasado (Mauro Posadas) — 1:49
Una Aventura Más (Juan Guevara) — 1:28
Sin Tí (Mauro Posadas) — 1:51
Perdóname (Mauro Posadas) — 1:20
Me Hace Falta Tu Amor (Juan Guevara) — 1:46
Secreto Amor (Mauro Posadas) — 2:07
Quien Vive en Mi (Juan Guevara) — 1:07
Te He Prometido (Leo Dan) — 1:01
Lo Nuestro Termino (Mauro Posadas) — 2:00
Vete Ya (Juan Guevara) — 1:39

Chart performance

References

Grupo Bryndis compilation albums
2001 compilation albums
Disa Records compilation albums
Spanish-language compilation albums